Miller High School may refer to:

United States
 Miller High School (Michigan)
 Miller High School (Miller, Missouri)
 Miller High School (Corning, Ohio)
 Miller High School (Corpus Christi, Texas)

Canada
 Miller Comprehensive High School; Regina, Saskatchewan

See also
A. B. Miller High School in Fontana, California
Kelly Miller High School in Clarksburg, West Virginia (defunct)
T. R. Miller High School in Brewton, Alabama